Ambarnagar is a village in Maharashtra, India. It is located in Umarga Taluka in Osmanabad district. The village resides in the Marathwada region, and falls under the supervision of the Aurangabad division. Located 73 km towards south from the district headquarters Osmanabad, the village is also 20 km from Umarga and 472 km from the state capital Mumbai.

Demographics 
The main language spoken here is Marathi. According to the 2011 Census, the total population of Ambarnagar village is 619 and number of houses are 102. The population of female citizens is 46% and the rate of female literacy is 20%.

Nearby villages 

 Sundar wadi is 6 km away
 Kantekur is 7 km away
 Naik nagar is 6 km away
 Umarga is 7 km away

Ambarnagar is surrounded by Åland taluka towards south, Lohara taluka towards north, Akkalkot taluka towards south, Tuljapur taluka towards west.

Nearby cities 
The cities near to Ambarnagar are Umarga, Tuljapur, Nilanga, Solapur.

Postal details 
The postal head office for Ambarnagar is Murum. The pin code of Ambarnagar is 413605.

Politics 
The National Congress Party (NCP), Shiv Sena, SHS and INC are the major political parties in Ambarnagar.

Polling stations near Ambarnagar 

 Minor Irrigation sub division Umarga
 Pratibha Niketan Murum south side east room
 Pratibha Niketan Murum north side P room
 Chhatrapati Shivaji Mahavidyalaya Balasur east side
 Z.P.P.S Alur west side

Education 
The colleges near Ambarnagar are:

 Shri Sharadchandraji Pawar Junior college Naichakur
 National Backward Agriculture Education Information Technology Osmanabad
 Sevagram college
 Sevagram college, Kawatha

The schools in Ambarnagar are:

 Adarsh Highschool
 Dr. Zakir Hussain Urdu Highschool
 Pratibha Niketan Vidyalaya
 Chhatrapati Shivaji Vidyalaya

References 

Geography of Maharashtra